The following is an incomplete list of hip hop festivals, which encapsulates music festivals focused on hip hop music or other elements of hip hop culture. Hip hop music, also called rap music, is a music genre consisting of a stylized rhythmic music that commonly accompanies rapping, a rhythmic and rhyming speech that is chanted.

Festivals

Gallery

See also

Hip hop music
OVO Fest by Drake

Related lists 
The following lists have some or total overlap:
Czech hip hop#Czech hip hop festivals
List of music festivals
 List of jazz festivals
 List of reggae festivals
List of electronic music festivals

Related categories
 Music festivals
 Blues festivals
 Jazz festivals
 Electronic music festivals
 Reggae festivals
 Hip hop festivals

References

Hip hop
Hip hop